ANZ may refer to:

People
 Anz (musician), a British DJ and electronic musician

Banks
 ANZ (bank), Australia and New Zealand Banking Group Limited, the fourth-largest bank in Australia 
 ANZ Bank New Zealand, the largest bank in New Zealand
 ANZ (Fiji), one of the largest banks in Fiji
 ANZ Royal Bank, a bank in Cambodia
 ANZ Amerika Samoa Bank, a bank in American Samoa
 ANZ Bank Building (Fremantle)
 ANZ Bank Centre, the tenth tallest building in Sydney
 Trustees Chambers, a heritage-listed bank building in Brisbane, Queensland, Australia, once known as an ANZ Bank building

Sports
 AFL New Zealand, the governing body of Australian rules football in New Zealand
 ANZ Championship (golf)
 ANZ Tasmanian International (tennis)
 Archery New Zealand, the national governing body for the sport of Archery in New Zealand
 Athletics New Zealand, the national organisation for athletics in New Zealand
 Australasia at the Olympics, the combined team of Australia and New Zealand in 1908 and 1912
 Queensland Sport and Athletics Centre, known as ANZ Stadium from 1993 to 2003
 Stadium Australia, a.k.a. ANZ Stadium

Transportation
 Air New Zealand, airline's ICAO code
 Airways New Zealand, the sole Air Traffic Service provider in New Zealand
 Anerley railway station (London), from its UK National Rail code

Other uses
 Academic ranks (Australia and New Zealand)
 Animal Planet (Australia and New Zealand)
 Antarctica New Zealand, an Institute that manages New Zealand's interests in Antarctica and the Ross Sea
 ANZ Centre, a skyscraper in Auckland, New Zealand